Cultural bias is the phenomenon of interpreting and judging phenomena by standards inherent to one's own culture. The phenomenon is sometimes considered a problem central to social and human sciences, such as economics, psychology, anthropology, and sociology. Some practitioners of the aforementioned fields have attempted to develop methods and theories to compensate for or eliminate cultural bias.

Cultural bias occurs when people of a culture make assumptions about conventions, including conventions of language, notation, proof and evidence. They are then accused of mistaking these assumptions for laws of logic or nature. Numerous such biases exist, concerning cultural norms for color, mate selection, concepts of justice, linguistic and logical validity, the acceptability of evidence, and taboos.

Psychology 
Cultural bias has no a priori definition. Instead, its presence is inferred from differential performance of socioracial (e.g., Blacks, Whites), ethnic (e.g., Latinos/Latinas, Anglos), or national groups (e.g., Americans, Japanese) on measures of psychological constructs such as cognitive abilities, knowledge or skills (CAKS), or symptoms of psychopathology (e.g., depression). Historically, the term grew out of efforts to explain between group score differences on CAKS tests primarily of African American and Latino/Latina American test takers relative to their White American counterparts and concerns that test scores should not be interpreted in the same manner across those groups in the name of fairness and equality (see also Cognitive dissonance). Although the concept of cultural bias in testing and assessment also pertains to score differences and potential misdiagnoses with respect to a broader range of psychological concepts, particularly in applied psychology and other social and behavioral sciences, this aspect of cultural bias has received less attention in the relevant literature.

Cultural bias in psychological testing refers to the standardized psychological tests that are conducted to determine the level of intelligence among the test-takers. Limitations of such verbal or non-verbal intelligence tests have been observed since their introduction. Many tests have been objected to, as they produced poor results for the ethnic or racial minorities (students), as compared to the racial majorities. There is minimal evidence supporting claims of cultural bias and cross-cultural examination is both possible and done frequently. As discussed above, the learning environment, the questions posed or situations given in the test may be familiar and strange at the same time to students from different backgrounds- the type of ambiguity in which intellectual differences become apparent in individual capacities to resolve the strange-yet-familiar entity.

Economics
Cultural bias in economic exchange is often overlooked. A study done at the Northwestern University suggests that the cultural perception that two countries have of each other plays a large factor in the economic activity between them. The study suggests that low bilateral trust between two countries results in less trade, less portfolio investment, and less direct investment. The effect is amplified for goods, as they are more trust-intensive.

Anthropology
The concept of culture theory in anthropology explains that cultural bias is a critical piece of human group formation.

Sociology
It is thought that societies with conflicting beliefs will more likely have cultural bias, as it is dependent on the group's standing in society in which the social constructions affect how a problem is produced. One example of cultural bias within the context of sociology can be seen in a study done at the University of California by Jane R. Mercer of how test "validity", "bias", and "fairness" in different cultural belief systems affect one's future in a pluralistic society. A definition of the cultural bias was given as "the extent that the test contains cultural content that is generally peculiar to the members of one group but not to the members of another group", which leads to a belief that "the internal structure of the test will differ for different cultural groups". In addition, the different types of errors made on culture-biased tests are dependent on different cultural groups. The idea progressed to the conclusion that a non-cultural-test represents the ability of a population as intended and not the abilities of a group that is not represented.

History
Cultural bias may also arise in historical scholarship when the standards, assumptions and conventions of the historian's own era are anachronistically used to report and to assess events of the past. The tendency is sometimes known as presentism and is regarded by many historians as a fault to be avoided. Arthur Marwick has argued that "a grasp of the fact that past societies are very different from our own, and... very difficult to get to know" is an essential and fundamental skill of the professional historian and that "anachronism is still one of the most obvious faults when the unqualified (those expert in other disciplines, perhaps) attempt to do history."

See also

 Cognitive bias
 Confirmation bias
 Cultural pluralism
 Determinism
 Embodied philosophy
 Environmental racism
 Ethnocentrism
 Framing (social sciences)
 Goodness and value theory
 Observer-expectancy effect
 Out-group homogeneity
 Social Darwinism
 Social learning theory
 Theory-ladenness
 Ultimate attribution error
 Xenocentrism

References

Bibliography

External links

Cognitive biases
Cultural anthropology
Value (ethics)
Ethnocentrism
Bias